Gaspar de Molina y Zaldívar (1741–1806) was a Spanish architect, painter, poet and writer.

Spanish male writers
People from Cádiz
1741 births
1806 deaths